Cyprinion milesi is a species of ray-finned fish in the genus Cyprinion from Pakistan, Afghanistan and Iran.

Footnotes 

 

milesi
Fish described in 1880